Mathias Hoppe (born 6 August 1970) is an East German sprint canoer who competed in the early 1990s. He won a silver medal in the K-4 500 m event at the 1990 ICF Canoe Sprint World Championships in Poznań.

References

German male canoeists
Living people
ICF Canoe Sprint World Championships medalists in kayak
1958 births